The terms obeah and wanga are African diasporic words that occur in The Book of the Law (the sacred text of Thelema, written by English author and occultist Aleister Crowley in 1904):

(AL I:37).

 is a folk religion and folk magic found among those of African descent in the West Indies. It is derived from West African Igbo sources and has a close North American parallel in African American conjure or hoodoo.

A  (sometimes spelled  or ) is a magical charm packet found in the folk magic practices of Haiti, and as such it is connected to the West African religion of Vodun, which in turn derives from the Fon people of what is now Benin.

In Thelema

In his Commentaries, Crowley explains:

He goes on to say:

See also
Ceremonial magic
Sex magic
List of magical terms and traditions

References

Citations

Works cited

Further reading
 
 

Thelema